729 Naval Air Squadron (729 NAS) was a Naval Air Squadron of the Royal Navy's Fleet Air Arm. It was active between 1945 and 1946 as an Instrument Flying Training squadron, for service in the far east.

History of 729 NAS

Instrument Flying Training (1945 - 1946)

729 Naval Air Squadron formed on 1 January 1945 at RNAS Hinstock (HMS Godwit), Shropshire, as an Instrument Flying Training squadron and as an offshoot of 758 NAS, the Royal Naval Advanced Instrument Flying Training Unit, for service in the Far East. It made use of 758 NAS's North American Harvard and Airspeed Oxford aircraft, enabling working up while based on the U.K. The squadron personnel took passage for India on 16 April 1945, without aircraft.

On 15 May 1945, personnel from 729 NAS arrived at Royal Navy Aircraft Repair Yard Coimbatore (HMS Garuda) in Southern India. They spent three weeks working up, ready to continue Instrument Flying training, utilising four Airspeed Oxford and a single North American Harvard which was issued on arrival.

On 7 June 1945, the squadron relocated approximately 275 miles northeast to Royal Navy Aircraft Maintenance Yard Tambaram (HMS Valluru), however, the squadron very shortly later, moved again and on 10 July 1945 it moved to RNAS Puttalam (HMS Rajaliya), Sri Lanka.

Japan surrendered on 15 August 1945 and due to the end of WWII, the need for pilots was reduced and the squadron's role was reassessed. On 30 August 1945 729 NAS relocated to RNAS Katukurunda (HMS Ukussa), remaining in Sri Lanka. In the new year of 1946 two Supermarine Sea Otter were added to the squadron. These were from 1700 Naval Air Squadron, ‘B’ Flight, which undertook Air-sea rescue sorties. However, this was withdrawn in April 1946.

On 24 July 1946, at RNAS Katukurunda, 729 Naval Air Squadron disbanded.

Aircraft flown

Between 1945 and 1946, 729 NAS flew a number of different aircraft types, including:

 North American Harvard (May 1945-Jul 1946)
Airspeed Oxford (May 1945-Jul 1946)
Supermarine Sea Otter (Jan 1946-Apr 1946)
de Havilland Tiger Moth (March 1946 - June 1946)

Naval Air Stations  

729 Naval Air Squadron operated from a number of naval air stations of the Royal Navy, in England and overseas in India and Sri Lanka:
Royal Naval Air Station HINSTOCK (1 January 1945 - 16 April 1945)
-transit- (16 April 1945 - 15 May 1945)
Royal Naval Aircraft Repair Yard COIMBATORE (15 May 1945 - 7 July 1945)
Royal Naval Aircraft Maintenance Yard TAMBARAM (7 July 1945 - 20 July 1945)
Royal Naval Air Station PUTTALAM (20 July 1945 - 30 August 1945)
Royal Naval Air Station KATUKURUNDA (30 August 1945 - 24 July 1946)

Commanding Officers 

List of commanding officers of 729 Naval Air Squadron with month and year of appointment and end:

 Lt-Cdr (A) H. R. Law, RNVR (Jan 1945 - Nov 1945)
 Lt (A) A. H. Bender, RNVR (Nov 1945 - Jul 1946)

References

Citations

Bibliography

700 series Fleet Air Arm squadrons
Military units and formations established in 1945
Military units and formations of the Royal Navy in World War II